This is a list of notable events in music that took place in the year 1935.

Specific locations
1935 in British music
1935 in Norwegian music

Specific genres
1935 in country music
1935 in jazz

Events
February 26 – Georges Bizet's Symphony in C (1855) is performed for the first time, under Felix Weingartner, in Basel, Switzerland.
April 8 – Béla Bartók's String Quartet No. 5 is premièred in Washington, D.C.
April 23 – Your Hit Parade is broadcast for the first time on radio.
June 14 – Three X Sisters "2000 requests for the number (The Three Little Pigs Are Porkchops Now), over W1XBS (radio), Waterburians went into a spin. Many from this city." Song also performed June 3, on WJZ (CBS) by the trio, guest appearance on the popular radio program 'One Night Stand.'
July 15 – Alban Berg finishes his Violin Concerto.
December 1 – Sergei Prokofiev's Violin Concerto No. 2 is premièred in Madrid
date unknown
Soprano Bidu Sayão marries baritone Giuseppe Danise.
Swing music achieves popularity.
Frank Sinatra begins his professional singing career as a member of the Hoboken Four.
Natalino Otto makes his debut on US radio.
Brussels Philharmonic is founded as Groot Symfonie-Orkest within Dutch-language public broadcaster NRI/INR.
John Serry Sr. begins regular appearances at the Rainbow Room in Rockefeller Plaza, New York City.

Albums released

Published popular music
 "About a Quarter to Nine" words: Al Dubin music: Harry Warren. Introduced by Al Jolson in the film Go into Your Dance
 "According to the Moonlight" w. Jack Yellen & Herb Magidson m. Joseph Meyer
"Alone" w. Arthur Freed m. Nacio Herb Brown. Introduced by Allan Jones and Kitty Carlisle in the film A Night at the Opera
 "An Evening In June" w. Tot Seymour m. Vee Lawnhurst
 "Animal Crackers in My Soup" w. Ted Koehler & Irving Caesar m. Ray Henderson. Introduced by Shirley Temple in the film Curly Top
 "A Beautiful Lady in Blue" w. Sam M. Lewis m. J. Fred Coots
 "Begin the Beguine" w.m. Cole Porter
 "Bess Oh Where Is My Bess" George Gershwin, Ira Gershwin, DuBose Heyward
 "Bess, You Is My Woman Now" w. DuBose Heyward & Ira Gershwin m. George Gershwin
 "The Blues Jumped A Rabbit" w.m. Jimmie Noone
 "Broadway Rhythm" w. Arthur Freed m. Nacio Herb Brown
 "The Broken Record" w.m. Cliff Friend, Charles Tobias & Boyd Bunch
 "But Where Are You?" w.m. Irving Berlin
 "The Buzzard" m. Bud Freeman
 "Buzzard Song" w. DuBose Heyward m. George Gershwin
 "Casino De Paree" w. Al Dubin m. Harry Warren. Introduced by Al Jolson in the film Go into Your Dance
 "Cheek to Cheek" w.m. Irving Berlin. Introduced by Fred Astaire in the film Top Hat
 "Christopher Robin Is Saying His Prayers" w.m. A. A. Milne & Harold Fraser-Simson
 "Cidade Maravilhosa" by André Filho
 "Clouds" w. Gus Kahn m. Walter Donaldson
 "The Cockeyed Mayor of Kaunakakai" w. R. Alex Anderson & Al Stillman m. R. Alex Anderson
 "Cosi Cosa" w. Ned Washington m. Bronislaw Kaper & Walter Jurmann
"Curly Top" w. Ted Koehler m. Ray Henderson. Introduced by John Boles in the film Curly Top
 "Darling, Je Vous Aime Beaucoup" w.m. Anna Sosenko
 "Dese Dem Dose" m. Glenn Miller
 "Dinner For One, Please James" w.m. Michael Carr
 "The Dixieland Band" m. Johnny Mercer m. Bernard Hanighen
 "Don't Give Up The Ship" w. Al Dubin m. Harry Warren
 "Don't Mention Love To Me" Oscar Levant & Dorothy Fields
 "Down By The River" w. Lorenz Hart m. Richard Rodgers
 "Dust Off That Old Pianna" w.m. Irving Caesar, Sammy Lerner & Gerald Marks
 "East of the Sun (and West of the Moon)" w.m. Brooks Bowman
 "Eeny, Meeny, Miney, Mo" w.m. Johnny Mercer & Matt Malneck
 "Every Little Moment" w. Dorothy Fields m.Jimmy McHugh
 "Every Now and Then" w.m. Al Sherman, Abner Silver and Al Lewis.
 "Everything's Been Done Before" w.m. Harold Adamson, Jack King & Edwin H. Knopf
 "Everything's In Rhythm With My Heart" w.m. Al Goodhart, Al Hoffman & Maurice Sigler
 "Fanlight Fanny" George Formby, Harry Gifford and Frederick E. Cliffe
 "From The Top Of Your Head" w. Mack Gordon m. Harry Revel
 "Got A Bran' New Suit" w. Howard Dietz m. Arthur Schwartz
 "Harlem Chapel Chimes" m. Glenn Miller
 "(Lookie, Lookie, Lookie) Here Comes Cookie" w.m. Mack Gordon
 "Honky Tonk Train" m. Meade Lux Lewis
 "Hooray For Love" w. Dorothy Fields m. Jimmy McHugh. Introduced by Gene Raymond in the film Hooray for Love
 "I Built a Dream One Day" w. Oscar Hammerstein II m. Sigmund Romberg. Introduced by Walter Slezak, Walter Woolf King and Robert C. Fischer in the musical May Wine.
 "I Can't Get Started" w. Ira Gershwin m. Vernon Duke
 "I Dream Too Much (Alone)" w. Dorothy Fields m. Jerome Kern
 "I Feel A Song Coming On" w. Dorothy Fields & George Oppenheimer m. Jimmy McHugh
 "I Feel Like A Feather In The Breeze" w. Mack Gordon m. Harry Revel
 "I Got Plenty o' Nuttin'" w. Ira Gershwin & DuBose Heyward m. George Gershwin
 "I Loves You, Porgy" w. DuBose Heyward & Ira Gershwin m. George Gershwin
 "I Wish I Were Aladdin" w. Mack Gordon m. Harry Revel
 "I Wished on the Moon" w. Dorothy Parker m. Ralph Rainger
 "I Won't Dance" w. Dorothy Fields & Jimmy McHugh m. Jerome Kern
 "I'd Love To Take Orders From You" w. Al Dubin m. Harry Warren
 "I'd Rather Lead A Band" w.m. Irving Berlin. Introduced by Fred Astaire in the film Follow the Fleet
 "I'll Never Say "Never Again" Again" w.m. Harry M. Woods
 "I'm Building Up To An Awful Letdown" w. Johnny Mercer m. Fred Astaire
 "I'm Gonna Sit Right Down and Write Myself a Letter" w. Joe Young m. Fred E. Ahlert
 "I'm in the Mood for Love" w. Dorothy Fields m. Jimmy McHugh. Introduced by Frances Langford in the film Every Night at Eight.
 "I'm Living In A Great Big Way" w. Dorothy Fields m. Jimmy McHugh. Introduced by Bill Robinson and Jeni Le Gon in the film Hooray for Love.
 "I'm Shooting High" w. Ted Koehler m. Jimmy McHugh
 "I'm Sitting High On A Hilltop" w. Gus Kahn m. Arthur Johnston
 "I'm Wearin' My Green Fedora" Al Sherman, Al Lewis, Joseph Meyer.
 "In A Little Gypsy Tea Room" w. Edgar Leslie m. Joe Burke
 "In a Sentimental Mood" w. Manny Kurtz & Irving Mills m. Duke Ellington
 "In The Middle Of A Kiss" w.m. Sam Coslow
 "Isn't This a Lovely Day?" w.m. Irving Berlin. Introduced by Fred Astaire in the film Top Hat
 "It Ain't Necessarily So" w. Ira Gershwin m. George Gershwin
 "It's An Old Southern Custom" w. Jack Yellen m. Joseph Meyer
 "It's Easy to Remember" w. Lorenz Hart m. Richard Rodgers
 "I've Got My Fingers Crossed" w. Ted Koehler m. Jimmy McHugh
 "Just One of Those Things" w.m. Cole Porter
 "The Lady In Red" w. Mort Dixon m. Allie Wrubel. Introduced in the film In Caliente by Wini Shaw, Edward Everett Horton, George Humbert and Judy Canova.
 "Last Night When We Were Young" w. E. Y. Harburg m. Harold Arlen
 "Let's Dance" w.m. Fanny Baldridge, Gregory Stone & Joseph Bonime
 "Life Is A Song (Let's Sing It Together)" w. Joe Young m. Frank E. Ahlert
 "Lights Out" by Billy Hill
 "A Little Bit Independent" w. Edgar Leslie m. Joe Burke
 "Little Girl Blue" w. Lorenz Hart m. Richard Rodgers. Introduced by Gloria Grafton in the musical Billy Rose's Jumbo.
 "A Little White Gardenia" w.m. Sam Coslow
 "Love Is a Dancing Thing" w. Howard Dietz m. Arthur Schwartz
 "Love Me Forever" by Gus Kahn
 "Lovely to Look at" w. Dorothy Fields & Jimmy McHugh m. Jerome Kern
 "Lullaby of Broadway" w. Al Dubin m. Harry Warren
 "Lulu's Back In Town" w. Al Dubin m. Harry Warren. Introduced by Dick Powell and The Mills Brothers in the film Broadway Gondolier.
 "Maybe" w.m. Allan Flynn & Frank Madden
 "Men About Town" w.m. Noël Coward
 "Miss Brown To You" w. Leo Robin m. Ralph Rainger & Richard A. Whiting
 "Moon Over Miami" w. Edgar Leslie m. Joe Burke
 "Moonburn" w. Edward Heyman m. Hoagy Carmichael
 "The Most Beautiful Girl in the World" w. Lorenz Hart m. Richard Rodgers. Introduced by Donald Novis and Gloria Grafton in the musical Jumbo.
 "Mrs Worthington" w.m. Noël Coward
 "The Music Goes 'Round and Around" w. "Red" Hodgson m. Edward Farley & Michael Riley
 "My Heart And I" w. Leo Robin m. Frederick Hollander
 "My Man's Gone Now" w. DuBose Heyward m. George Gershwin
 "My Romance" w. Lorenz Hart m. Richard Rodgers
 "My Very Good Friend The Milkman" w. Johnny Burke m. Harold Spina
 "Noche de ronda", by Agustin Lara
 "No Strings (I'm Fancy Free)" w.m. Irving Berlin. Introduced by Fred Astaire in the film Top Hat
 "Nobody's Darlin' But Mine" w.m. Jimmie Davis
 "On the Beach at Bali-Bali" w.m. Al Sherman, Abner Silver, Jack Meskill
 "On Treasure Island" w. Edgar Leslie m. Joe Burke, Myers, Wendling
 "Paris in the Spring" w. Mack Gordon m. Harry Revel. Introduced by Mary Ellis in the film Paris in Spring
 "The Piccolino" by Irving Berlin. Introduced by Ginger Rogers in the film Top Hat
"A Picture Of Me Without You" w.m. Cole Porter. Introduced by June Knight and Charles Walters in the musical Jubilee
 "Red Sails in the Sunset" w. Jimmy Kennedy m. Will Grosz
 "Roll Along, Prairie Moon" w.m. Albert Von Tilzer, Harry McPherson & Ted Fiorito
 "The Rose In Her Hair" w. Al Dubin m. Harry Warren. Introduced by Dick Powell in the film Broadway Gondolier.
 "Say "Si Si"" w. (Eng) Al Stillman (Sp) Francia Luban m. Ernesto Lecuona
 "Shadow Play" w.m. Noël Coward
 "She's A Latin From Manhattan" w. Al Dubin m. Harry Warren. Introduced by Al Jolson in the film Go into Your Dance
 "Shoe Shine Boy" w. Sammy Cahn m. Saul Chaplin
 "So Long, It's Been Good To Know You" w.m. Woody Guthrie
 "Solo Hop" m. Glenn Miller
 "Soon (Maybe Not Tomorrow)" w. Lorenz Hart m. Richard Rodgers
 "Summertime" w. DuBose Heyward m. George Gershwin
 "Take Me Back To My Boots And Saddle" w.m. Walter G, Samuels, Leonard Whitcup & Teddy Powell
 "Thanks a Million" w. Gus Kahn m. Arthur Johnston. Introduced by Dick Powell in the film Thanks a Million.
 "There's A Boat Dat's Leavin' Soon For New York" w. Ira Gershwin m. George Gershwin
 "There's No One With Endurance Like The Man Who Sells Insurance" Frank Crumit, Curtis
 "These Foolish Things" w. Holt Marvell m. Jack Strachey & Harry Link
 "This Time It's Love" by Sam M. Lewis
 "Tic-tac do Meu Coração" by Alcyr Pires Red and Walfrido Silva
 "Tomorrow's Another Day" w.m. Glenn Miller
 "Top Hat, White Tie and Tails" w.m. Irving Berlin. Introduced by Fred Astaire in the film Top Hat
 "Trois Fables de Lafontaine" w.m. Marcelle de Manziarly
 "When Icky Morgan Plays the Organ" w.m. Glenn Miller
 "When Somebody Thinks You're Wonderful" Harry M. Woods
 "Who's Been Polishing The Sun" w.m. Noel Gay
 "Why Shouldn't I?" w.m. Cole Porter. Introduced by Margaret Adams in the musical Jubilee.
 "Why Stars Come Out At Night" w.m. Ray Noble
 "With All My Heart" w. Gus Kahn m. Jimmy McHugh. Introduced by Peggy Conklin in the 1936 film Her Master's Voice
 "A Woman Is A Sometime Thing" w. DuBose Heyward m. George Gershwin
 "You Are My Lucky Star" w. Arthur Freed m. Nacio Herb Brown
 "You Hit the Spot" w. Mack Gordon m. Harry Revel. Performed by Frances Langford in the 1936 musical film Collegiate.
 "You Let Me Down" w. Al Dubin m. Harry Warren. Introduced by Jane Froman in the film Stars Over Broadway
 "Your Feet's Too Big" w.m. Ada Benson & Fred Fisher
 "You're an Angel" by Jimmy McHugh
 "You're an Eyeful of Heaven" w. Mort Dixon m. Allie Wrubel. Introduced by Patricia Ellis in the film Bright Lights.
 "You're The Only Star (In My Blue Heaven)" w.m. Gene Autry

Top popular recordings 1935

The top popular records of 1935 listed below were compiled from Joel Whitburn's Pop Memories 1890–1954, record sales reported on the "Discography of American Historical Recordings" website, and other sources as specified. Numerical rankings are approximate, there were no Billboard charts in 1935, the numbers are only used for a frame of reference.

Christmas songs
"När ljusen tändas därhemma" – translated into Swedish by Nils Hellström
"Santa Claus Is Comin' to Town" by J. Fred Coots and Haven Gillespie
 "Jingle Bells" by Benny Goodman & His Orchestra
 "Silent Night" by Bing Crosby

Classical music

Premieres

Compositions
Alban Berg – Violin Concerto
Aaron Copland – Statements for Orchestra
Ernst von Dohnányi – Sextet for piano, violin, viola, cello, clarinet and horn, Op. 37
Sir George Dyson – Belshazzar's Feast
Hanns Eisler – Lenin Requiem
George Enescu
Cello Sonata No. 2 in C major, Op. 26, No. 2
Piano Sonata No. 3 in D major, Op. 24, No. 3
Rudolf Escher – Piano Sonata No. 1
Pierre-Octave Ferroud – Sonnerie pour le Hérault 
Vittorio Giannini – Piano Concerto
Paul Hindemith – Der Schwanendreher for Viola and Orchestra
André Hossein – Towards the Light (ballet)
Akira Ifukube – Japanese Rhapsody
Uuno Klami – Psalmus (oratorio)
Hans Pfitzner – Cello Concerto No. 1 in G Major
Francis Poulenc – Suite française
Sergei Prokofiev – Violin Concerto No. 2 in G Minor, Op. 63
Roger Sessions – Violin Concerto
Petar Stojanović – Sava (symphonic poem)
William Walton – Symphony No. 1

Opera
Brian Easdale – The Corn King
Reynaldo Hahn – Le marchand de Venise
Karl Amadeus Hartmann – Simplicius Simplicissimus Jugend (composed between 1934 and 1936; performance of Hartmann's works banned by the Nazis after 1933)
Arthur Honegger – Jeanne d'Arc au bûcher (dramatic oratorio)
Pietro Mascagni – Nerone
Alexander Zemlinsky – Der König Kandaules (first performance 1996)

Film
Benjamin Britten – Coal Face
Benjamin Britten – Men Behind the Meters
Aram Khachaturian – Pepo (film)
Erich Korngold – Captain Blood (1935 film)
Franz Waxman – Bride of Frankenstein

Jazz

Musical theatre
 Anything Goes London production opened at the Palace Theatre on June 14 and ran for 261 performances
 The Gay Deceivers London production opened at the Coliseum on September 7 and ran for 123 performances
 Glamorous Night (w. Christopher Hassall m. Ivor Novello) – London production opened at the Theatre Royal on May 2 and ran for 243 performances
Jubilee Broadway production opened at the Imperial Theatre on October 12 and ran for 169 performances.
 Jumbo Broadway production opened at the Hippodrome on November 16 and ran for 233 performances.
 May Wine Broadway production opened at the St. James Theatre on December 5 and ran for 213 performances.
 Porgy and Bess (George Gershwin) – Broadway production opened at the Alvin Theatre on October 10 and ran for 124 performances
 Stop Press London production opened at the Adelphi Theatre on February 21.

Musical films
 Antonia, starring Marcelle Chantal, Fernand Gravey and Josette Day, with music by Paul Abraham and Alfred Rode
 Be Careful, Mr Smith starring Bobbie Comber
 The Bird Seller (Der Vogelhändler), starring Maria Andergast, Wolf Albach-Retty and Lil Dagover, based on the operetta by Carl Zeller.
 Bright Lights starring Joe E. Brown, Ann Dvorak and Patricia Ellis. Directed by Busby Berkeley.
 Broadway Gondolier released July 27 starring Dick Powell and Joan Blondell, and featuring The Mills Brothers and Ted Fio Rito & his Band.
 Broadway Melody of 1936 starring Jack Benny, Eleanor Powell, Una Merkel and Robert Taylor and featuring Frances Langford
 Casta diva, starring Mártha Eggerth, with music by Vincenzo Bellini
 Curly Top released August 2 starring Shirley Temple
 Dizzy Dames starring Marjorie Rambeau, Inez Courtney, Fuzzy Knight and Kitty Kelly
 El caballo del pueblo, starring Irma Córdoba
 El día que me quieras, starring Carlos Gardel, Rosita Moreno and Tito Lusiardo, with music by Gardel and lyrics by Alfredo Le Pera
 Estudantes, starring Carmen Miranda, Mesquitinha and Mário Reis, with music by João de Barro, Alberto Ribeiro and others
 Every Night at Eight starring Alice Faye, Frances Langford and Patsy Kelly
 First a Girl starring Jessie Matthews and Sonnie Hale
 George White's 1935 Scandals starring Alice Faye, Cliff Edwards and Eleanor Powell
 Go into Your Dance released April 20 starring Al Jolson and Ruby Keeler
 Heart's Desire starring Richard Tauber
 Hooray for Love starring Ann Sothern, Gene Raymond and Pert Kelton, and featuring Bill Robinson and Fats Waller
In Caliente starring Dolores del Río, Pat O'Brien, Leo Carillo and Edward Everett Horton and featuring Wini Shaw
 Invitation to the Waltz, starring Lilian Harvey
 King Solomon of Broadway starring Edmund Lowe, Dorothy Page and Pinky Tomlin
 Königswalzer, starring Paul Hörbiger, Curd Jürgens and Carola Höhn
 Naughty Marietta starring Jeanette MacDonald, Nelson Eddy and Elsa Lanchester
 The Night Is Young starring Ramon Novarro, Evelyn Laye, Charles Butterworth, Una Merkel and Edward Everett Horton
 Paddy O'Day starring Jane Withers, Pinky Tomlin and Rita Hayworth
 Princesse Tam Tam, starring Josephine Baker and Albert Préjean
 Reckless starring Jean Harlow and William Powell and featuring Allan Jones and Nina Mae McKinney.
 Redheads on Parade starring John Boles, Dixie Lee and Jack Haley
 Roberta starring Ginger Rogers, Fred Astaire, Irene Dunne and Randolph Scott.
 She Shall Have Music starring Jack Hylton, June Clyde and Brian Lawrance. Directed by Leslie S. Hiscott.
 Shipmates Forever starring Dick Powell and Ruby Keeler
 Stars Over Broadway (released November 5), starring Jane Froman and James Melton
 Sweet Music starring Rudy Vallée, Ann Dvorak and Helen Morgan
 Thanks a Million starring Dick Powell and Ann Dvorak
 Top Hat starring Fred Astaire and Ginger Rogers
 Two for Tonight starring Bing Crosby, Joan Bennett and Thelma Todd
 Two Hearts in Harmony starring Bernice Claire and George Curzon and featuring Chick Endor, Charles Farrell and Jack Harris & his Orchestra. Directed by William Beaudine.

Births
January 8 – Elvis Presley, rock & roll singer (died 1977)
January 10 
 Sherrill Milnes, American operatic baritone
 Ronnie Hawkins, American rockabilly singer (died 2022)
January 19 – Johnny O'Keefe, Australian singer-songwriter (died 1978)
January 20 – Dorothy Provine, American actress, singer and dancer (died 2010)
January 24 – Gaqo Çako, Albanian opera singer (died 2018)
February 3 – Johnny "Guitar" Watson, African-American singer, songwriter and musician (died 1996)
February 5 – Alex Harvey, rock singer (died 1982)
February 11
Bent Lorentzen, Danish composer (died 2018)
Gene Vincent, American rock & roll singer (died 1971)
February 12 – Gene McDaniels, American singer and songwriter (died 2011)
February 16 – Sonny Bono, American singer, actor and record producer (died 1998)
February 18
Ciarán Bourke, Irish folk musician (died 1988)
Gennady Gladkov, Soviet and Russian composer
February 27 – Mirella Freni, operatic soprano (died 2020)
March 17 – Adam Wade, singer, drummer and actor (died 2022)
March 29 – Ruby Murray, singer (died 1996)
March 30 – Gordon Mumma, composer
March 31 – Herb Alpert, American trumpeter and bandleader
April 5 – Peter Grant, manager and record executive (Led Zeppelin) (died 1995)
April 6 – Fred Bongusto, Italian light music singer, songwriter and composer (died 2019)
April 7 – Bobby Bare, American singer/songwriter
April 9 – Aulis Sallinen, Finnish composer
April 10 – Jerzy Milian, Polish jazz vibraphonist (died 2018)
April 16 – Bobby Vinton, singer
April 19 – Dudley Moore, English composer, jazz pianist and comic actor (died 2002)
April 22 – Paul Chambers, jazz bassist (died 1969)
April 23 – Ray Peterson, singer (died 2005)
May 9 – Nokie Edwards, American guitarist and actor (The Ventures) (died 2018)
May 10 – Larry Williams, American singer, songwriter and pianist (died 1980)
May 13 – Teddy Randazzo, American singer-songwriter and accordion player (died 2003)
May 16 – Akihiro Miwa, Japanese singer, actor, director, composer, author and drag queen
May 27 – Ramsey Lewis, African-American jazz musician and composer (died 2022)
June 1 – Hazel Dickens, American singer-songwriter and guitarist (died 2011)
June 17 – Peggy Seeger, American folk singer
June 24 – Terry Riley, American minimalist composer
June 25 – Eddie Floyd, African-American soul singer and songwriter
June 26 – Dwight York, American singer (Passion)
July 1 – James Cotton, African-American harmonica player, singer and songwriter (died 2017)
July 5 – Shirley Collins, English folk singer
July 8 – Steve Lawrence, American singer (Steve and Eydie)
July 9
 Mercedes Sosa, Argentine singer (died 2009)
 Mighty Sparrow, Grenadian singer
July 12 – Barry Mason, English songwriter (died 2021)
July 17
 Diahann Carroll, American actress and singer (died 2019)
 Peter Schickele, American composer and classical music parodist
July 24 – Les Reed, English songwriter and light orchestra leader (died 2019)
July 29
Jacques Levy, songwriter (died 2004)
Morella Muñoz, mezzo-soprano (died 1995)
August 2 – Hank Cochran, country music singer/songwriter (died 2010)
August 10 – Giya Kancheli, Soviet and Georgian composer (died 2019)
August 15 – Jim Dale, singer, songwriter and actor
August 16 – Bobby Mitchell, New Orleans do-wop and R&B singer (died 1986)
August 18 – Sir Howard Morrison, concert singer (died 2009)
August 30 – John Phillips, singer, guitarist and songwriter (The Mamas & the Papas) (died 2001)
September 1 – Seiji Ozawa, Japanese conductor
September 7 – Ronnie Dove, pop and country singer who had several chart records throughout the 60s and 70s 
September 9 – Chaim Topol, singer and performer (Fiddler on the Roof) (died 2023)
September 11 – Arvo Pärt, classical composer
September 14 – Ángel Medardo Luzuriaga, Ecuadorian musical artist (died 2018)
September 19 – Nick Massi, rock bass singer/guitarist (The Four Seasons) (died 2000)
September 20 – László Aradszky, Hungarian singer (died 2017)
September 21 – Henry Gibson, American actor, singer and songwriter (died 2009)
September 22 – Virgilijus Noreika, Lithuanian tenor (died 2018)
September 29 – Jerry Lee Lewis, singer, songwriter and pianist (died 2022)
September 30
Z. Z. Hill, blues singer (died 1984)
Johnny Mathis, singer
October 1 – Julie Andrews, singer and actress
October 5 – Khayyam Mirzazade, Azerbaijani composer and teacher (died 2018)
October 12
Samuel David Moore, Southern soul and R&B singer (Sam and Dave)
Luciano Pavarotti, operatic tenor (died 2007)
October 14 – La Monte Young, composer
October 15 – Barry McGuire, singer and songwriter
October 17 – Michael Eavis, English dairy farmer, founder of the Glastonbury Festival
October 20 – Jerry Orbach, musical theatre actor (died 2004)
October 21 – Derek Bell, harpist and composer (died 2002)
November 4 – Laila Sari, Indonesian comedian and singer (died 2017)
November 13 – P. Susheela, Indian playback singer
November 17 – Imrat Khan, sitar player (died 2018)
November 18 – Alain Barrière, French singer (died 2019)
November 27 – Al Jackson, Jr., R&B drummer, producer and songwriter (Booker T. & the M.G.'s) (died 1975)
November 30 – Usha Mangeshkar, Indian singer
December 23 – Little Esther Phillips, singer (died 1984)
December 26 – Abdul "Duke" Fakir, singer (Four Tops)
date unknown – Mogens Ellegaard, accordionist (died 1995)

Deaths
January 8
Jesse Garon Presley, stillborn twin of Elvis Presley
Rauf Yekta, Turkish musicologist and author (born 1871)
January 9 – Dina Edling, operatic mezzo-soprano (born 1854)
January 11 – Marcella Sembrich, coloratura soprano (born 1858)
January 13 – Heinrich Schenker, music theorist (born 1868)
January 22 – Zequinha de Abreu, musician and composer (born 1880)
January 28 – Mikhail Ippolitov-Ivanov, composer (born 1859)
February – Alice Esty, operatic soprano (born 1864)
February 2 – Clara Smith, blues singer (born c. 1894)
February 28 – Chiquinha Gonzaga, composer (born 1847)
April 2 – Bennie Moten, jazz pianist and bandleader (born 1894)
April 5 – Emil Młynarski, violinist, conductor and composer (born 1870)
April 9 – Israel Schorr, cantor (born 1886)
April 16 – Victor Ewald, composer (born 1860)
April 23 – Georgina Stirling, operatic soprano (born 1866)
April 24 – Paul Klengel, pianist, violinist, composer (born 1854)
April 29 – Leroy Carr, blues musician (born 1905)
May 3 – Charles Manners, operatic bass (born 1857)
May 10 – Herbert Witherspoon, operatic bass and opera manager (born 1873)
May 16 – Leopold Lichtenberg, violinist (born 1861)
May 17 – Paul Dukas, composer (born 1865)
May 19 – Charles Martin Loeffler, American composer (born 1861)
May 28 – Jelka Rosen, wife of Frederick Delius (born 1868)
May 29 – Josef Suk, composer (born 1874)
June 6 – Jacques Urlus, operatic tenor (born 1867)
June 24 – in an air crash in Colombia:
Carlos Gardel, tango singer (born 1890)
Alfredo Le Pera, lyricist (born 1900)
July 21 – Honoré Dutrey, jazz trombonist (born c. 1894)
August 2 – Isidore de Lara, composer (born 1858)
August 20 – Otakar Ostrčil, composer and conductor (born 1879)
August 21 – Marjorie White, actress, singer and dancer (born 1904) (in a car crash)
September 11 – Evelyn Hoey, torch singer (born 1910) (suicide)
September 20 – Amy Sherwin, operatic soprano (born 1855)
September 23 – DeWolf Hopper, US actor and singer (born 1858)
October 4 – Marie Gutheil-Schoder, operatic soprano (born 1874)
October 13 – Dranem, French singer and music hall entertainer (born 1869)
October 22 – Komitas, exiled Armenian priest and ethnomusicologist (born 1869)
November 16 – Kurt Schindler, conductor and composer (born 1882)
November 18 – Anton Hekking, cellist (born 1856)
November 27 – Charlie Green, jazz trombonist (born c. 1900)
November 28 – Erich von Hornbostel, musicologist (born 1877)
December 4 – Johan Halvorsen, violinist, conductor and composer (born 1864)
December 9 – Nina Grieg, soprano and wife of Edvard Grieg (born 1845)
December 24 – Alban Berg, composer (born 1885)

Awards
Henryk Wieniawski Violin Competition – Ginette Neveu

References

 
20th century in music
Music by year